This list of gastropods described in 2017 is a list of new taxa of snails and slugs of every kind that have been described (following the rules of the ICZN) during the year 2017. The list only includes taxa at the rank of genus or species. For changes in taxonomy above the level of genus, see Changes in the taxonomy of gastropods since 2005.

Fossil gastropods

Marine gastropods

New species

Neomphalina
Dracogyra subfuscus Chen, Zhou, Wang & Copley, 2017
 Lamellomphalus manusensis Zhang & Zhang, 2017
Lirapex politus Chen, Zhou, Wang & Copley, 2017

Vetigastropoda
 Emarginula poppeorum Romani & Crocetta in Romani, Rolán, Simone & Crocetta, 2017
 Perotrochus sunderlandorum Petuch & Berschauer, 2017
 Margarites manusensis Zhang & Zhang, 2017
 Margarites similis Zhang & Zhang, 2017
 Turbo sazae Fukuda, 2017

Neritimorpha
 Neritilia abeli Espinosa, Ortea & Diez-García, 2017
 Neritilia serrana Espinosa, Ortea & Diez-García, 2017

Caenogastropoda
 Alvania marmarisensis Bitlis & Öztürk, 2017
 Athleta easoni Petuch & Berschauer, 2017
 Microliotia rehderi Kase & Raines, 2017
 Scalaronoba arenula Stephens & Vafiadis, 2017
 Scalaronoba kryptopleurakia Stephens & Vafiadis, 2017

Littorinimorpha
 Caecum codoceoae Gálvez & Huidobro, 2017
Circuitus caledonicus Rubio & Rolán, 2017
Circuitus medius Rubio & Rolán, 2017
Circuitus monoplanes Rubio & Rolán, 2017
Circuitus philippinensis Rubio & Rolán, 2017
Circuitus solomonensis Rubio & Rolán, 2017
Circuitus vanuatuensis Rubio & Rolán, 2017
 Cleovitrina andreiae Fehse & Grego, 2017
 Novastoa rapaitiensis Schiaparelli, Bieler, Golding, Rawlings & Collins, 2017
 Simnialena paita Fehse, 2017
 Thylacodes vandyensis Bieler, Rawlings & Collins in Bieler et al., 2017

Neogastropoda
 Aesopus foucherae Lussi, 2017
 Africonus freitasi Tenorio, Afonso, Rolán, Pires, Vasconcelos, Abalde & Zardoya, 2017
 Agathotoma guadalupensis Espinosa & Ortea in Espinosa, Ortea & Moro, 2017
Alisimitra barazeri Fedosov, Herrmann & Bouchet, 2017
Alisimitra deforgesi Fedosov, Herrmann & Bouchet, 2017
Alisimitra samadiae Fedosov, Herrmann & Bouchet, 2017
 Antimitrella convexa Lussi, 2017
 Antimitrella kublai Lussi, 2017
 Antimitrella plana Lussi, 2017
 Antimitrella slateri Lussi, 2017
 Bactrocythara cubana Espinosa, Ortea & Moro, 2017
 Calagrassor analogus Fraussen, Chino & Stahlschmidt, 2017
 Calagrassor hagai Fraussen, Chino & Stahlschmidt, 2017
 Coralliophila curacaoensis Potkamp & Hoeksema in Potkamp, Vermeij & Hoeksema, 2017
 Costoanachis alcazari Ortea & Espinosa, 2017
 Costoanachis aurea Lussi, 2017
 Costoanachis calidoscopio Espinosa, Ortea & Diez García, 2017
 Costoanachis jeffreysbayensis Lussi, 2017
 Crassispira aurea Kantor, Stahlschmidt, Aznar-Cormano, Bouchet & Puillandre, 2017
 Crassispira procera Kantor, Stahlschmidt, Aznar-Cormano, Bouchet & Puillandre, 2017
 Crassispira scala Kantor, Stahlschmidt, Aznar-Cormano, Bouchet & Puillandre, 2017
 Curtitoma georgоssiani Merkuljev, 2017
 Decipifus fenestratus Lussi, 2017
 Domiporta valdacantamessae Maxwell, Dekkers, Berschauer & Congdon, 2017
 Eratoidea madinina Espinosa & Ortea, 2017
 Eratoidea orbignyana Espinosa & Ortea, 2017
 Favartia lafayettei Espinosa & Ortea, 2017
 Favartia martinicaensis Espinosa & Ortea, 2017
 Fusiconus levenensis Monnier & Tenorio, 2017
 Fusinus bishopi Petuch, Berschauer & Waller, 2017
 Gibberula aurelieae Ortea, 2017
 Gibberula madbelono Ortea, 2017
 Gibberula mapipi Ortea, 2017
 Hastula engi Malcom & Terryn, 2017
 Hemilienardia acinonyx Fedosov, Stahlschmidt, Puillandre, Aznar-Cormano & Bouchet, 2017
 Hemilienardia lynx Fedosov, Stahlschmidt, Puillandre, Aznar-Cormano & Bouchet, 2017
 Hemilienardia pardus Fedosov, Stahlschmidt, Puillandre, Aznar-Cormano & Bouchet, 2017
 Hyalina bonjour Ortea & Espinosa, 2017
 Hyalina egregia Espinosa, Ortea & Diez García, 2017
 Hyalina fortsaintlouis Ortea & Espinosa, 2017
 Inquisitor ritae Stahlschmidt & Fraussen, 2017
 Jaspidiconus carvalhoi Petuch & Berschauer, 2017
 Jaspidiconus ferreirai Petuch & Berschauer, 2017
 Jaspidiconus lindapowersae Petuch & Berschauer, 2017
 Kanamarua wangae Monsecour, Fraussen & Fei, 2017
 Kioconus sakalava Monnier & Tenorio, 2017
 Mitrella millardi Lussi, 2017
 Mitromorpha jaguaense Espinosa & Ortea, 2017
 Mitromorpha sanctaluciaense Espinosa & Ortea, 2017
 Nannodiella baracoesa Espinosa, Ortea & Moro, 2017
 Nannodiella cubadiella Espinosa, Ortea & Moro, 2017
 Neoancilla madagascariensis Herrmann, 2017
 Otitoma boucheti Morassi, Nappo & Bonfitto, 2017
 Otitoma crassivaricosa Morassi, Nappo & Bonfitto, 2017
 Otitoma elegans Morassi, Nappo & Bonfitto, 2017
 Otitoma hadra Morassi, Nappo & Bonfitto, 2017
 Otitoma neocaledonica Morassi, Nappo & Bonfitto, 2017
 Otitoma nereidum Morassi, Nappo & Bonfitto, 2017
 Otitoma philippinensis Morassi, Nappo & Bonfitto, 2017
 Otitoma philpoppei Morassi, Nappo & Bonfitto, 2017
 Otitoma rubiginostoma Morassi, Nappo & Bonfitto, 2017
 Otitoma sororcula Morassi, Nappo & Bonfitto, 2017
 Otitoma tropispira Morassi, Nappo & Bonfitto, 2017
 Otitoma xantholineata Morassi, Nappo & Bonfitto, 2017
 Parvanachis pepecarrascoi Ortea & Espinosa, 2017
 Phymorhynchus oculatus Zhang & Zhang, 2017
 Polystira cubacaribbaea Espinosa, Ortea & Moro, 2017
 Polystira eloinae Espinosa, Ortea & Moro, 2017
 Polystira jaguaella Espinosa, Ortea & Moro, 2017
 Polystira jiguaniensis Espinosa, Ortea & Moro, 2017
 Polystira juangrinensis Espinosa, Ortea & Moro, 2017
 Polystira parvula Espinosa, Ortea & Moro, 2017
 Pusia ivanmarrowi Marrow, 2017
 Pusia simoneae Marrow, 2017
 Pusia versicolor Marrow, 2017
 Pusia voluta Marrow, 2017
 Raphitoma ephesina Pusateri, Giannuzzi Savelli & Stahlschmidt, 2017
 Reticunassa annabolteae Galindo, Kool & Dekker, 2017
 Reticunassa goliath Galindo, Kool & Dekker, 2017
 Reticunassa intrudens Galindo, Kool & Dekker, 2017
 Reticunassa poppeorum Galindo, Kool & Dekker, 2017
 Reticunassa thailandensis Galindo, Kool & Dekker, 2017
 Reticunassa visayaensis Galindo, Kool & Dekker, 2017
 Siphonochelus mozambicus Houart, 2017
 Thaisella guatemalteca Simone, 2017
 Tritia djerbaensis Aissaoui, Galindo, Puillandre & Bouchet, 2017
 Tritia pallaryana Aissaoui, Galindo, Puillandre & Bouchet, 2017
 Virgiconus malabaricus Monnier, Limpalaër & Tenorio, 2017
 Volvarina granmaense Espinosa, Ortea & Diez García, 2017
 Volvarina jibara Espinosa, Ortea & Diez García, 2017
 Volvarina sanctacruzense Espinosa, Ortea & Diez García, 2017

Ptenoglossa
 Cirsotrema ctenodentatum Zelaya & Güller, 2017
 Cirsotrema georgeanum Zelaya & Güller, 2017
 Cirsotrema strebeli Zelaya & Güller, 2017
 Epitonium evanidstriatum Zelaya & Güller, 2017
 Palisadia rittneri Mienis, 2017

Heterobranchia

 Acteon fasuloi Crocetta, Romani, Simone & Rolán in Romani, Rolán, Simone & Crocetta, 2017
 Adalaria rossica Martynov & Korshunova, 2017
 Adalaria ultima Martynov & Korshunova, 2017
 Aldisa fragaria Tibiriçá, Pola & Cervera, 2017
 Aldisa zavorensis Tibiriçá, Pola & Cervera, 2017
 Borealia sanamyanae Korshunova, Martynov, Bakken, Evertsen, Fletcher, Mudianta, Saito, Lundin, Schrödl & Picton, 2017
 Carronella enne Korshunova, Martynov, Bakken, Evertsen, Fletcher, Mudianta, Saito, Lundin, Schrödl & Picton, 2017
 Clione okhotensis Yamazaki & Kuwahara, 2017
 Coryphellina lotos Korshunova, Martynov, Bakken, Evertsen, Fletcher, Mudianta, Saito, Lundin, Schrödl & Picton, 2017
 Doris acerico Ortea & Espinosa, 2017
 Doris juanformelli Ortea & Espinosa, 2017
 Doris parrae Ortea, 2017
 Elysia chavelavargas Ortea, 2017
 Elysia delcarmen Ortea, 2017
 Elysia jaramilloi Ortea, Moro & Bacallado, 2017
 Felimare aurantimaculata Ortigosa, Pola & Cervera, 2017
 Fjordia chriskaugei Korshunova, Martynov, Bakken, Evertsen, Fletcher, Mudianta, Saito, Lundin, Schrödl & Picton, 2017
 Gulenia monicae Korshunova, Martynov, Bakken, Evertsen, Fletcher, Mudianta, Saito, Lundin, Schrödl & Picton, 2017
 Gulenia orjani Korshunova, Martynov, Bakken, Evertsen, Fletcher, Mudianta, Saito, Lundin, Schrödl & Picton, 2017
 Knoutsodonta pictoni Furfaro & Trainito, 2017
 Lapinura aestus Ortea, Moro & Espinosa, 2017
 Lapinura josemeloi Ortea, Moro & Espinosa, 2017
 Okenia picoensis Paz-Sedano, Ortigosa & Pola, 2017
 Onchidoris expectata Martynov & Korshunova, 2017
 Pacifia amica Korshunova, Martynov, Bakken, Evertsen, Fletcher, Mudianta, Saito, Lundin, Schrödl & Picton, 2017
 Paracoryphella ignicrystalla Korshunova, Martynov, Bakken, Evertsen, Fletcher, Mudianta, Saito, Lundin, Schrödl & Picton, 2017
 Paradoris annularis Ortea, Espinosa & Moro, 2017
 Samla takashigei Korshunova, Martynov, Bakken, Evertsen, Fletcher, Mudianta, Saito, Lundin, Schrödl & Picton, 2017
 Unidentia nihonrossija Korshunova, Martynov, Bakken, Evertsen, Fletcher, Mudianta, Saito, Lundin, Schrödl & Picton, 2017
 Unidentia sandramillenae Korshunova, Martynov, Bakken, Evertsen, Fletcher, Mudianta, Saito, Lundin, Schrödl & Picton, 2017
 Zelentia ninel Korshunova, Martynow & Picton, 2017
 Ziminella abyssa Korshunova, Martynov, Bakken, Evertsen, Fletcher, Mudianta, Saito, Lundin, Schrödl & Picton, 2017
 Ziminella circapolaris Korshunova, Martynov, Bakken, Evertsen, Fletcher, Mudianta, Saito, Lundin, Schrödl & Picton, 2017

New subspecies
 Apata pricei komandorica Korshunova, Martynov, Bakken, Evertsen, Fletcher, Mudianta, Saito, Lundin, Schrödl & Picton, 2017
 Australasiatica langfordi poppeorum Lorenz & Chiapponi, 2017
 Austrocypraea reevei bishopi Petuch, Berschauer & Waller, 2017
 Austrocypraea reevei lorenzoi Chiapponi, 2017
 Bistolida stolida lorrainae Lorenz, 2017
 Bistolida ursellus jomi Meyer & Lorenz, 2017
 Cribrarula abaliena erypersica Meyer & Lorenz, 2017
 Cypraea tigris lorenzi Meyer & Tweedt, 2017
 Erronea caurica chrismeyeri Lorenz, 2017
 Lyncina ventriculus johnclarki Meyer & Lorenz, 2017
 Mauritia maculifera andreae Erdmann & Lorenz, 2017
 Mauritia scurra occidua Meyer & Lorenz, 2017
 Microchlamylla gracilis zfi Korshunova, Martynov, Bakken, Evertsen, Fletcher, Mudianta, Saito, Lundin, Schrödl & Picton, 2017
 Mitraelyria mitraeformis grockeae Petuch, Berschauer & Waller, 2017
 Palmadusta ziczac yzac Meyer & Lorenz, 2017
 Purpuradusta fimbriata insolita Meyer & Lorenz, 2017
 Purpuradusta minoridens julianjosephi Lorenz, 2017
 Ransoniella punctata bridgesi Meyer & Lorenz, 2017
 Ransoniella punctata conleyi Meyer & Lorenz, 2017

New genera

 Aegeofusinus Russo, 2017
 Apata Korshunova, Martynov, Bakken, Evertsen, Fletcher, Mudianta, Saito, Lundin, Schrödl & Picton, 2017
 Baenopsis Korshunova, Martynov, Bakken, Evertsen, Fletcher, Mudianta, Saito, Lundin, Schrödl & Picton, 2017
 Borealea Korshunova, Martynov, Bakken, Evertsen, Fletcher, Mudianta, Saito, Lundin, Schrödl & Picton, 2017 (replacement name for Borealia Korshunova, Martynov, Bakken, Evertsen, Fletcher, Mudianta, Saito, Lundin, Schrödl & Picton, 2017)
 Carronella Korshunova, Martynov, Bakken, Evertsen, Fletcher, Mudianta, Saito, Lundin, Schrödl & Picton, 2017
 Circuitus Rubio & Rolán, 2017
 Dracogyra Chen, Zhou, Wang & Copley, 2017
 Edmundsella Korshunova, Martynov, Bakken, Evertsen, Fletcher, Mudianta, Saito, Lundin, Schrödl & Picton, 2017
 Fjordia Korshunova, Martynov, Bakken, Evertsen, Fletcher, Mudianta, Saito, Lundin, Schrödl & Picton, 2017
 Gulenia Korshunova, Martynov, Bakken, Evertsen, Fletcher, Mudianta, Saito, Lundin, Schrödl & Picton, 2017
 Itaxia Korshunova, Martynov, Bakken, Evertsen, Fletcher, Mudianta, Saito, Lundin, Schrödl & Picton, 2017
 Kynaria Korshunova, Martynov, Bakken, Evertsen, Fletcher, Mudianta, Saito, Lundin, Schrödl & Picton, 2017
 Luisella Korshunova, Martynov, Bakken, Evertsen, Fletcher, Mudianta, Saito, Lundin, Schrödl & Picton, 2017
 Microchlamylla Korshunova, Martynov, Bakken, Evertsen, Fletcher, Mudianta, Saito, Lundin, Schrödl & Picton, 2017
 Occidenthella Korshunova, Martynov, Bakken, Evertsen, Fletcher, Mudianta, Saito, Lundin, Schrödl & Picton, 2017 (replacement name for Occidentella Korshunova, Martynov, Bakken, Evertsen, Fletcher, Mudianta, Saito, Lundin, Schrödl & Picton, 2017)
 Orienthella Korshunova, Martynov, Bakken, Evertsen, Fletcher, Mudianta, Saito, Lundin, Schrödl & Picton, 2017 (replacement name for Orientella Korshunova, Martynov, Bakken, Evertsen, Fletcher, Mudianta, Saito, Lundin, Schrödl & Picton, 2017)
 Pacifia Korshunova, Martynov, Bakken, Evertsen, Fletcher, Mudianta, Saito, Lundin, Schrödl & Picton, 2017
 Paraflabellina Korshunova, Martynov, Bakken, Evertsen, Fletcher, Mudianta, Saito, Lundin, Schrödl & Picton, 2017
 Recourtoliva Petuch & Berschauer, 2017
 Vullietoliva Petuch & Berschauer, 2017
 Zelentia Korshunova, Martynow & Picton, 2017
 Ziminella Korshunova, Martynov, Bakken, Evertsen, Fletcher, Mudianta, Saito, Lundin, Schrödl & Picton, 2017

Freshwater gastropods

New species

 Belgrandia alvaroi Holyoak, Holyoak & Mendes, 2017
 Belgrandia jordaoi Holyoak, Holyoak & Mendes, 2017
 Bythinella yerlii Gürlek, 2017
 Bithynia kayrae Odabaşı & Odabaşı, 2017
 Bullaregia tunisiensis Khalloufi, Béjaoui & Delicado, 2017
 Erhaia wangchuki Gittenberger, Sherub & Stelbrink, 2017
 Fluminicola fresti Hershler, Liu & Hubbart, 2017
 Fluminicola umpquaensis Hershler, Liu & Hubbart, 2017
 Grossuana maceradica Boeters, Glöer & Stamenković, 2017
 Idaholanx fresti Clark, Campbell & Lydeard, 2017
 Iglica soussensis Ghamizi & Boulal, 2017
 Islamia burduricus Yıldırım, Çağlan Kaya, Gürlek & Bahadır Koca, 2017
 Islamia mylonas Radea, Parmakelis, Demetropoulos & Vardinoyannis, 2017
 Mercuria corsensis Boeters & Falkner, 2017
 Paladilhiopsis falniowskii Grego, Glöer, Erőss & Fehér, 2017
 Paladilhiopsis lozei Grego, Glöer, Erőss & Fehér, 2017
 Paladilhiopsis prekalensis Grego, Glöer, Erőss & Fehér, 2017
 Paladilhiopsis szekeresi Grego, Glöer, Erőss & Fehér, 2017
 Paladilhiopsis wohlberedti Grego, Glöer, Erőss & Fehér, 2017
 Plagigeyeria steffeki Grego, Glöer, Erőss & Fehér, 2017
 Pontobelgrandiella lavrasi Boeters, Reischütz & Reischütz, 2017
 Potamolithus elenae de Lucía & Gutiérrez Gregoric, 2017
 Pseudobithynia adiyamanensis Gürlek, 2017
 Pseudorientalia ceriti Gürlek, 2017
 Pyrgulopsis lindahlae Hershler, Liu, Forsyth, Hovingh & Wheeler, 2017
 Pyrgulopsis nuwuvi Hershler, Liu, Forsyth, Hovingh & Wheeler, 2017
 Pyrgulopsis santaclarensis Hershler, Liu, Forsyth, Hovingh & Wheeler, 2017
 Tchangmargarya ziyi Zhang, 2017

New genera
 Bullaregia Khalloufi, Béjaoui & Delicado, 2017
Devetakiola Georgiev in Georgiev et al., 2017
Idaholanx Clark, Campbell & Lydeard, 2017
Stoyanovia Georgiev in Georgiev et al., 2017

Land gastropods

New species
 Acrotoma likharevi Solodovnikov & Szekeres, 2017
 Acrotoma reshaviensis Solodovnikov & Szekeres, 2017
Alycaeus selangoriensis Foon & Liew, 2017
Alycaeus costacrassa Foon & Liew, 2017
Alycaeus ikanensis Foon & Liew, 2017
Alycaeus alticola Foon & Liew, 2017
Alycaeus charasensis Foon & Liew, 2017
Alycaeus kurauensis Foon & Liew, 2017
Alycaeus regalis Foon & Liew, 2017
Alycaeus virgogravida Foon & Liew, 2017
Alycaeus senyumensis Foon & Liew, 2017
Alycaeus expansus Foon & Liew, 2017
Alycaeus clementsi Foon & Liew, 2017
 Amphidromus syndromoideus Inkhavilay & Panha, 2017
 Amphidromus xiengkhaungensis Inkhavilay & Panha, 2017
 Angustopila stochi Páll-Gergely & Jochum in Páll-Gergely, Jochum & Asami, 2017
 Annularisca haylerae Espinosa, Herrera-Uría & Ortea, 2017
 Apoecus ramelauensis Köhler, Criscione, Burghardt & Kessner, 2017
 Arangia humboldtiana Espinosa, Herrera-Uría & Ortea, 2017
 Arinia yanseni Nurinsiyah & Hausdorf, 2017
 Bellardiella kovacsi Varga & Páll-Gergely, 2017
 Bellardiella saparuana Varga & Páll-Gergely, 2017
 Carcinostemma silvai Espinosa, Herrera-Uría & Ortea, 2017
 Carychium hardiei Jochum & Weigand in Jochum et al., 2017
 Carychium belizeensis Jochum & Weigand in Jochum et al., 2017
 Carychium zarzaae Jochum & Weigand in Jochum et al., 2017
 Chondropomium caelicum Watters & Larson, 2017
 Chondropomium sardonyx Watters & Larson, 2017
 Clydonopoma titanum Watters & Larson, 2017
 Colonina gerhardfellneri Watters & Frank-Fellner, 2017
 Coryda caraballoi Espinosa, Herrera-Uría & Ortea, 2017
 Coryda thierryi Espinosa, Herrera-Uría & Ortea, 2017
 Cotyorica nemethi Grego & Szekeres, 2017
 Dautzenbergiella paulae Grego & Szekeres, 2017
 Dendrolimax parensis Rowson, Paustian & van Goethem, 2017
 Dentisphaera maxema Páll-Gergely & Jochum in Páll-Gergely, Jochum & Asami, 2017
 Diplommatina abiesiana Budha & Naggs in Budha, Naggs & Backeljau, 2017
 Diplommatina fistulata Budha & Naggs in Budha, Naggs & Backeljau, 2017
 Diplommatina godawariensis Budha & Naggs in Budha, Naggs & Backeljau, 2017
 Diplommatina halimunensis Nurinsiyah & Hausdorf, 2017
 Diplommatina heryantoi Nurinsiyah & Hausdorf, 2017
 Diplommatina kakenca Nurinsiyah & Hausdorf, 2017
 Diplommatina maipokhariensis Budha & Naggs in Budha, Naggs & Backeljau, 2017
 Diplommatina ristiae Nurinsiyah & Hausdorf, 2017
 Diplommatina salgharica Budha & Backeljau in Budha, Naggs & Backeljau, 2017
 Diplommatina shivapuriensis Budha & Backeljau in Budha, Naggs & Backeljau, 2017
 Diplommatina syabrubesiensis Budha & Backeljau in Budha, Naggs & Backeljau, 2017
 Diplommatina timorensis Greke, 2017
 and other 53 new species of Diplommatinidae described by Greke, 2017
 Diplopoma mucaralense Espinosa, Herrera-Uría & Ortea, 2017
 Ditropopsis ciliata Greke, 2017
 Emoda poeyana Espinosa, Herrera-Uría & Ortea, 2017
 Formosana kremeri Grego & Szekeres, 2017
 Fuchsiana zhangqingae Grego & Szekeres, 2017

 Gastrocopta sharae Salvador, Cavallari & Simone, 2017
 Glessula tamakoshi Budha & Backeljau in Budha, Naggs & Backeljau, 2017
 Harmozica zangezurica Gural-Sverlova, Amiryan & Gural, 2017
 Kenyirus balingensis Tan, Chan & Foon, 2017
 Kerkophorus piperatus Herbert, 2017
 Kerkophorus scrobicolus Herbert, 2017
 Kerkophorus terrestris Herbert, 2017
 Kerkophorus vittarubra Herbert, 2017
 Kugitangia hatagica Schileyko, Pazilov & Abdulazizova, 2017
 Leptichnoides avisexcrementis Rowson, Paustian & van Goethem, 2017
 Luzonocoptis angulata Páll-Gergely & Hunyadi in Páll-Gergely, Hunyadi & Asami, 2017
 Luzonocoptis antenna Páll-Gergely & Hunyadi in Páll-Gergely, Hunyadi & Asami, 2017
 Margaritiphaedusa hunyadii Grego & Szekeres, 2017
 Melayonchis aileenae Dayrat & Goulding in Dayrat, Goulding, Apte, Bhave & Xuân, 2017
 Melayonchis annae Dayrat in Dayrat, Goulding, Apte, Bhave & Xuân, 2017
 Melayonchis eloisae Dayrat in Dayrat, Goulding, Apte, Bhave & Xuân, 2017
 Melayonchis siongkiati Dayrat & Goulding in Dayrat, Goulding, Apte, Bhave & Xuân, 2017
 Messageriella gargominyi Páll-Gergely & Szekeres, 2017
 Metalycaeus minatoi Páll-Gergely in Páll-Gergely & Asami, 2017
 Microkerkus sibaya Herbert, 2017
 Micropontica olgae Solodovnikov & Szekeres, 2017

 Minaselates paradoxa Cuezzo & Pena, 2017
 Monacha tibarenica Neiber & Hausdorf, 2017
 Mysticarion obscurior Hyman, Lamborena & Köhler, 2017
 Obeliscus diegoi Espinosa, Herrera-Uría & Ortea, 2017
 Oospira yanghaoi Grego & Szekeres, 2017
 Parmavitrina flavocarinata Hyman, Lamborena & Köhler, 2017
 Parmavitrina maculosa Hyman, Lamborena & Köhler, 2017

 Perrottetia hongthinhae Do, 2017
 Pincerna yanseni Páll-Gergely, 2017
 Pupina sonlaensis Do, 2017
 Pupina thaitranbaii Do, 2017
 Rahula kleini Gittenberger, Leda & Sherub, 2017
 Rahula trongsaensis Gittenberger, Leda & Sherub, 2017
 Rishetia kathmandica Budha & Backeljau in Budha, Naggs & Backeljau, 2017
 Rishetia nagarjunensis Budha & Naggs in Budha, Naggs & Backeljau, 2017
 Rishetia rishikeshi Budha & Naggs in Budha, Naggs & Backeljau, 2017
 Rishetia subulata Budha & Naggs in Budha, Naggs & Backeljau, 2017
 Rishetia tribhuvana Budha in Budha, Naggs & Backeljau, 2017
 Scolodonta rinae Miquel & Bungartz, 2017
 Scutalus chango Araya & Breure, 2017
 Sesara triodon Tanmuangpak & Tumpeesuwan in Tanmuangpak, Tumpeesuwan & Tumpeesuwan, 2017
 Selatodryas luteosoma  Herbert, 2017
 Selatodryas roseosoma Herbert, 2017
 Sheldonia fingolandensis Herbert, 2017
 Selenophaedusa jimenezi Grego & Szekeres, 2017
 Serriphaedusa poppei Grego & Szekeres, 2017
 Serriphaedusa yanghaoi Grego & Szekeres, 2017
 Streptaulus longituba Páll-Gergely & Gargominy in Páll-Gergely et al., 2017
 Synprosphyma ambigua Grego & Szekeres, 2017
 Synprosphyma segersi Grego & Szekeres, 2017
 Tanzalimax seddonae Rowson, Paustian & van Goethem, 2017
 Tanzalimax tattersfieldi Rowson, Paustian & van Goethem, 2017
 Tonkinospira tomasini Páll-Gergely & Jochum in Páll-Gergely, Jochum & Asami, 2017
 Tropidauchenia sulcicollis Grego & Szekeres, 2017
 Tropidauchenia yanghaoi Grego & Szekeres, 2017
 Udzungwalimax suminis Rowson, Paustian & van Goethem, 2017
 Vulnus wallacei Páll-Gergely, Otani & Hosoda in Páll-Gergely, Otani, Hosoda, Asami & Harl, 2017

New subspecies
 Albinaria amalthea unipalatalis Nordsieck, 2017
 Albinaria arthuriana xenogena Nordsieck, 2017
 Albinaria candida monachorum Nordsieck, 2017
 Albinaria corrugata gemina Nordsieck, 2017
 Albinaria eburnea sprattiana Nordsieck, 2017
 Albinaria idaea letoana Nordsieck, 2017
 Albinaria loosjesi sigridae Nordsieck, 2017
 Albinaria maltzani ecristata Nordsieck, 2017
 Albinaria tenuicostata theresiae Nordsieck, 2017
 Albinaria teres andreae Nordsieck, 2017
 Albinaria troglodytes kitteli Nordsieck, 2017
 Albinaria xanthostoma diktymna Nordsieck, 2017
 Margaritiphaedusa whitteni kremerorum Grego & Szekeres, 2017
 Metafruticicola nicosiana viglensis Neubert & Hirschfelder, 2017
 Oospira naggsi parva Páll-Gergely & Szekeres, 2017
 Pseudoveronicella zootoca tanzaniensis Rowson, Paustian & van Goethem, 2017
 Speleodentorcula beroni maniates Reischütz, Steiner-Reischütz & Reischütz, 2017

New genera
 Amanica Nordsieck, 2017
 Attenborougharion Hyman & Köhler, 2017
 Backeljaia Chueca, Gómez-Moliner, Madeira & Pfenninger, 2017 
 Bellardiella (Szekeresia) Varga & Páll-Gergely, 2017
 Castanophaedusa Páll-Gergely & Szekeres, 2017
 Changphaedusa Motochin & Ueshima in Motochin, Wang & Ueshima, 2017
 Coronarchaica Neiber, Razkin & Hausdorf, 2017
 Cotyorica Grego & Szekeres, 2017
 Dendropa Marshall & Worthy, 2017
 Dentisphaera Páll-Gergely & Jochum in Páll-Gergely, Jochum & Asami, 2017
 Garnieria (Doducsangia) Páll-Gergely & Szekeres, 2017
 Metafruticicola (Elbasania) Schileyko & Fehér, 2017
 Kugitangia Schileyko, Pazilov & Abdulazizova, 2017
 Luzonocoptis Páll-Gergely & Hunyadi in Páll-Gergely, Hunyadi & Asami, 2017
 Megalophaedusa (Dimphaedusa) Motochin & Ueshima in Motochin, Wang & Ueshima, 2017
 Megalophaedusa (Tyrannophaedusoides) Motochin & Ueshima in Motochin, Wang & Ueshima, 2017
 Messageriella Páll-Gergely & Szekeres, 2017
 Minaselates Cuezzo & Pena, 2017
 Ogeramua Christensen, 2017
 Orexana Chueca, Gómez-Moliner, Madeira & Pfenninger, 2017
 Selatodryas Herbert, 2017
 Solitariphaedusa Motochin & Ueshima in Motochin, Wang & Ueshima, 2017
 Superbipoma Watters & Larson, 2017
 Ubiquitarion Hyman, Lamborena & Köhler, 2017
 Udzungwalimax Rowson, Paustian & van Goethem, 2017
 Zaptyx (Taiwanphaedusa) Motochin & Ueshima in Motochin, Wang & Ueshima, 2017
 Zarateana Chueca, Gómez-Moliner, Madeira & Pfenninger, 2017

See also 
 List of gastropods described in 2016
 List of gastropods described in 2018

References

External links
 Taxa of gastropods described in 2017 in WoRMS database.

Gastropods
Molluscs described in 2017